Among Angels  is a book written by the actress Jane Seymour released in 2010. It is presented as an inspirational work that focuses on the presence of angels among people.

Summary

References

2010 non-fiction books
Books about angels